Campaign is an unincorporated community in Warren County, Tennessee, United States. It lies just off U.S. Route 70S southwest of Rock Island and northeast of McMinnville. Its ZIP code is 38550.  The Collins River passes to the northwest of Campaign, while the Rocky River passes to the east.

The community is named for Joseph  (spelled without the "g"), an early settler who operated a store along the railroad tracks in the area during the latter half of the 19th century.  It was initially known as "Campaign Stop," but later shortened to "Campaign."

References

Unincorporated communities in Warren County, Tennessee
Unincorporated communities in Tennessee